ZSS-FM is a radio station in Nassau, Bahamas, broadcasting a gospel music format.  The station has its primary transmitter (ZSS-FM 89.9 MHz) in Nassau, with a repeater (ZSS-FM-2 95.5 MHz) in Marsh Harbour.

External links 
  (last known mirror of webpage, courtesy of the Web Archive)

Radio stations in the Bahamas
Christian radio stations in North America
Radio stations established in 2012